Ivanpah Valley Airport is a planned government relief airport for Harry Reid International Airport in the Las Vegas Valley, to be located in the Ivanpah Valley of the Mojave Desert, within Clark County, Nevada.

Since there is only limited space left for expansion at Harry Reid, due to being located adjacent to the Las Vegas Strip, a new airport is the only alternative to increase capacity by a significant amount. The project has been on hold since June 2010. The planned location for the airport is approximately 5 miles southwest of Jean Airport. It is not known whether the Jean Airport will have to be closed if the new airport is opened.  However, this would be likely due to the runways lining up and the interference between the small general aviation aircraft and commercial jets.

History
Legislation was signed on October 28, 2000, allowing the Clark County Commission to purchase land for a new commercial airport. The location is between the towns of Jean and Primm.

The airport had been planned to open in 2017. However the Clark County Department of Aviation announced the project was put on temporary hold as of June 2010 due to the Great Recession, until air traffic and tourism demands to Metro Las Vegas returns and increases.

As of mid-2018 it was planned that the environmental impact study would last at least two more years.

In 2023, the Clark County Department of Aviation projected that the current airport may reach capacity in 2030 and that a new airport would be operational no earlier than 2037.

Construction
Clark County Department of Aviation had hoped to start construction in 2010 and to open the facility in 2017. These dates were based on Harry Reid reaching 90% (49.5 million passengers) of its projected capacity of 55 million passengers in 2017, it actually had 48.5 million.  At that time, Harry Reid was expected to be at 55 million passengers in 2011. The economic recession of 2007-2010 has slowed demand considerably in the Las Vegas region and as a result, planning for the airport has slowed.  The federal environmental review process has been temporarily suspended and planning has slowed as well.

Most recently the project was working to meet the lengthy environmental studies required for major projects. The engineering consultant firm Vanasse Hangen Brustlin, Inc. was chosen as the firm to help prepare the Environmental Impact Statement for the airport.

Access to airport
The Interstate 15 right-of-way is expected to be used by the private Brightline West (formerly DesertXpress and XpressWest) high-speed rail line, purchased by Brightline in 2018. While no intermediate stops are planned, the railroad partnered with the airport authority in 2020 to ensure rail and flight operations and constructions would not conflict.

The also stalled California–Nevada Interstate Maglev line to connect Las Vegas with California was to terminate at the new airport.

References

External links
 Southern Nevada Supplemental Airport (SNSA) Environmental Impact Statement (EIS)
 Ivanpah Valley Airfield Alternative Analysis (IVAAAN) by NASA Aviation Systems Division

Airports in Clark County, Nevada
Ivanpah Valley
Mojave Desert
Proposed airports in the United States